The 2011–12 Los Angeles Clippers season was the 42nd season of the franchise in the National Basketball Association (NBA), their 34th season in Southern California, and their 28th season in Los Angeles. Following the 2011 NBA lockout each team only played 66 games instead of the usual 82. The Clippers finished 40–26, their best winning percentage in franchise history at the time.  They finished the season as the #5 seed in the Western Conference, returning to the playoffs for the first time since 2006.

In the playoffs, the Clippers defeated the Memphis Grizzlies in the First Round in seven games, but were swept by the San Antonio Spurs in the Semifinals in four games.

Key dates
 June 23: The 2011 NBA draft took place at Prudential Center in Newark, New Jersey.

Summary

NBA Draft 2011

Draft picks

Roster

Roster notes
 Forward Caron Butler becomes the 17th former Laker to play with the crosstown rival Clippers.
 Forward Bobby Simmons makes his second tour of duty with the Clippers.  He played for the team from 2003–2005.

Pre-season
Due to the 2011 NBA lockout negotiations, the programmed pre-season schedule, along with the first two weeks of the regular season were scrapped, and a two-game pre-season was set for each team once the lockout concluded.

|- bgcolor="#ccffcc"
| 1
| December 19
| @ L. A. Lakers
| 
| Chauncey Billups (23)
| Chris Paul (7)
| Chris Paul (9)
| Staples Center
| 1–0
|- bgcolor="ccffcc"
| 2
| December 21
| L. A. Lakers
| 
| Blake Griffin (30)
| DeAndre Jordan (7)
| Chris Paul (10)
| Staples Center
| 2–0

Regular season

Standings

Record vs. opponents

Game log

|- bgcolor=#cfc
| 1
| December 25
| @ Golden State
| 
| Blake Griffin (22)
| Caron Butler (10)
| Chris Paul (9)
| Oracle Arena19,596
| 1–0
|- bgcolor=#fcc
| 2
| December 28
| @ San Antonio
| 
| Blake Griffin (28)
| Blake Griffin (9)
| Chris Paul (9)
| AT&T Center18,581
| 1–1
|- bgcolor=#fcc
| 3
| December 30
| Chicago
| 
| Blake Griffin (34)
| Blake Griffin (13)
| Chris Paul (14)
| Staples Center
| 1–2

|- bgcolor=#cfc
| 4
| January 1
| Portland
| 
| Blake Griffin (20)
| DeAndre Jordan (11)
| Chris Paul (7)
| Staples Center19,060
| 2–2
|- bgcolor=#cfc
| 5
| January 4
| Houston
| 
| Blake Griffin (22)
| Blake Griffin (9)
| Chris Paul (10)
| Staples Center19,060
| 3–2
|- bgcolor=#cfc
| 6
| January 7
| Milwaukee
| 
| Blake Griffin (22)
| Blake Griffin (14)
| Chris Paul (7)
| Staples Center19,229
| 4–2
|- bgcolor=#fcc
| 7
| January 10
| @ Portland
| 
| Caron Butler (20)
| Blake Griffin (12)
| Chauncey BillupsMo Williams (4)
| Rose Garden20,381
| 4–3
|- bgcolor=#cfc
| 8
| January 11
| Miami
| 
| Chris Paul (27)
| Blake Griffin (12)
| Chris Paul (11)
| Staples Center19,341
| 5–3
|- bgcolor=#cfc
| 9
| January 14
| L. A. Lakers
| 
| Chris Paul (33)
| Blake Griffin (14)
| Chris Paul (6)
| Staples Center19,895
| 6–3
|- bgcolor=#cfc
| 10
| January 16
| New Jersey
| 
| Blake Griffin (23)
| Blake Griffin (14)
| Randy Foye (10)
| Staples Center19,060
| 7–3
|- bgcolor=#fcc
| 11
| January 17
| @ Utah
| 
| Caron Butler (14)
| Blake Griffin (11)
| Chauncey Billups (6)
| EnergySolutions Arena19,371
| 7–4
|- bgcolor=#cfc
| 12
| January 18
| Dallas
| 
| Mo Williams (26)
| Blake Griffin (17)
| Blake Griffin (7)
| Staples Center19,252
| 8–4
|- bgcolor=#fcc
| 13
| January 20
| Minnesota
| 
| Mo Williams (25)
| DeAndre Jordan (11)
| Mo Williams (5)
| Staples Center19,492
| 8–5
|- bgcolor=#cfc
| 14
| January 22
| Toronto
| 
| Mo Williams (26)
| DeAndre Jordan (16)
| Chauncey Billups (14)
| Staples Center19,060
| 9–5
|- bgcolor=#fcc
| 15
| January 25
| @ L. A. Lakers
| 
| Blake Griffin (26)
| Blake Griffin (9)
| Chris Paul (12)
| Staples Center18,997
| 9–6
|- bgcolor=#cfc
| 16
| January 26
| Memphis
| 
| Blake Griffin (20)
| Blake GriffinDeAndre Jordan (9)
| Blake Griffin (8)
| Staples Center19,275
| 10–6
|- bgcolor=#cfc
| 17
| January 29
| @ Denver
| 
| Chauncey Billups (32)
| Blake GriffinDeAndre Jordan (13)
| Chris Paul (7)
| Pepsi Center19,495
| 11–6
|- bgcolor=#cfc
| 18
| January 30
| Oklahoma City
| 
| Chris Paul (26)
| DeAndre Jordan (11)
| Chris Paul (14)
| Staples Center19,404
| 12–6

|- bgcolor=#cfc
| 19
| February 1
| @ Utah
| 
| Chris Paul (34)
| Blake Griffin (14)
| Chris Paul (11)
| EnergySolutions Arena19,637
| 13–6
|- bgcolor=#fcc
| 20
| February 2
| Denver
| 
| Blake Griffin (18)
| DeAndre Jordan (9)
| Chris Paul (9)
| Staples Center19,223
| 13–7
|- bgcolor=#cfc
| 21
| February 4
| @ Washington
| 
| Blake Griffin (21)
| Blake GriffinDeAndre Jordan (11)
| Blake GriffinMo Williams (8)
| Verizon Center19,419
| 14–7
|- bgcolor=#cfc
| 22
| February 6
| @ Orlando
| 
| Chris Paul (29)
| Blake Griffin (10)
| Chris Paul (8)
| Amway Center18,846
| 15–7
|- bgcolor=#fcc
| 23
| February 8
| @ Cleveland
| 
| Blake Griffin (25)
| Blake Griffin (15)
| Chris Paul (12)
| Quicken Loans Arena17,100
| 15–8
|- bgcolor=#cfc
| 24
| February 10
| @ Philadelphia
| 
| Chris Paul (24)
| Blake Griffin (11)
| Three players (4)
| Wells Fargo Center20,539
| 16–8
|- bgcolor=#cfc
| 25
| February 11
| @ Charlotte
| 
| Blake Griffin (21)
| DeAndre Jordan (12)
| Chris Paul (14)
| Time Warner Cable Arena19,110
| 17–8
|- bgcolor=#fcc
| 26
| February 13
| @ Dallas
| 
| Caron Butler (23)
| DeAndre Jordan (9)
| Chris Paul (9)
| American Airlines Center20,436
| 17–9
|- bgcolor=#cfc
| 27
| February 15
| Washington
| 
| Blake Griffin (23)
| Blake Griffin (15)
| Chris Paul (9)
| Staples Center19,135
| 18–9
|- bgcolor=#cfc
| 28
| February 16
| @ Portland
| 
| Blake Griffin (21)
| Blake Griffin (14)
| Randy Foye (4)
| Staples Center20,665
| 19–9
|- bgcolor=#fcc
| 29
| February 18
| San Antonio
| 
| Blake Griffin (22)
| Blake Griffin (20)
| Chris Paul (6)
| Staples Center19,217
| 19–10
|- bgcolor=#fcc
| 30
| February 20
| @ Golden State
| 
| Chris Paul (24)
| Reggie Evans (12)
| Chris Paul (6)
| Oracle Arena19,596
| 19–11
|- bgcolor=#cfc
| 31
| February 22
| Denver
| 
| Chris Paul (36)
| DeAndre Jordan (16)
| Chris Paul (9)
| Staples Center19,163
| 20–11
|- bgcolor=#fcc
| 32
| February 28
| Minnesota
| 
| Blake Griffin (30)
| DeAndre Jordan (14)
| Chris PaulMo Williams (6)
| Staples Center19,243
| 20–12

|- bgcolor=#cfc
| 33
| March 1
| @ Sacramento
| 
| Chris Paul (22)
| Blake Griffin (9)
| Chris Paul (9)
| Power Balance Pavilion15,512
| 21–12
|- bgcolor=#fcc
| 34
| March 2
| @ Phoenix
| 
| Blake Griffin (17)
| Caron ButlerKenyon Martin (8)
| Chris Paul (5)
| US Airways Center18,091
| 21–13
|- bgcolor=#cfc
| 35
| March 4
| @ Houston
| 
| Chris Paul (28)
| Blake Griffin, DeAndre Jordan (11)
| Chris Paul (10)
| Toyota Center16,646
| 22–13
|- bgcolor=#fcc
| 36
| March 5
| @ Minnesota
| 
| Blake Griffin (26)
| Blake Griffin, DeAndre Jordan (12)
| Chris Paul (5)
| Target Center19,509
| 22–14
|- bgcolor=#fcc
| 37
| March 7
| @ New Jersey
| 
| Blake Griffin (28)
| Blake Griffin (17)
| Chris Paul (10)
| Prudential Center18,711
| 22–15
|- bgcolor=#cfc
| 38
| March 9
| @ San Antonio
| 
| Chris Paul (36)
| Reggie Evans (13)
| Chris Paul (11)
| AT&T Center18,581
| 23–15
|- bgcolor=#fcc
| 39
| March 11
| Golden State
| 
| Blake Griffin (27)
| Reggie EvansBlake Griffin (12)
| Chris Paul (5)
| Staples Center19,183
| 23–16
|- bgcolor=#fcc
| 40
| March 12
| Boston
| 
| Blake Griffin (24)
| DeAndre Jordan (13)
| Chris Paul (5)
| Staples Center19,464
| 23–17
|- bgcolor=#cfc
| 41
| March 14
| Atlanta
| 
| Mo Williams (25)
| Reggie EvansBlake Griffin (210)
| Chris Paul (9)
| Staples Center19,060
| 24–17
|- bgcolor=#fcc
| 42
| March 15
| Phoenix
| 
| Blake Griffin (25)
| DeAndre Jordan (9)
| Chris Paul (11)
| Staples Center19,060
| 24–18
|- bgcolor=#cfc
| 43
| March 17
| Houston
| 
| Chris Paul (23)
| DeAndre Jordan (11)
| Chris Paul (5)
| Staples Center19,060
| 25–18
|- bgcolor=#cfc
| 44
| March 18
| Detroit
| 
| Chris Paul (19)
| Blake Griffin (11)
| Chris Paul (15)
| Staples Center19,060
| 26–18
|- bgcolor=#fcc
| 45
| March 20
| @ Indiana
| 
| Blake Griffin (23)
| Blake GriffinDeAndre Jordan (10)
| Chris Paul (8)
| Bankers Life Fieldhouse14,901
| 26–19
|- bgcolor=#fcc
| 46
| March 21
| @ Oklahoma City
| 
| Randy Foye (23)
| Blake Griffin (7)
| Chris Paul (10)
| Chesapeake Energy Arena18,203
| 26–20
|- bgcolor=#fcc
| 47
| March 22
| @ New Orleans
| 
| Blake Griffin (21)
| Blake Griffin (11)
| Chris Paul (9)
| New Orleans Arena17,209
| 26–21
|- bgcolor=#cfc
| 48
| March 24
| Memphis
| 
| Blake Griffin (20)
| Blake Griffin (10)
| Chris Paul (13)
| Staples Center19,060
| 27–21
|- bgcolor=#cfc
| 49
| March 26
| New Orleans
| 
| Chris Paul (25)
| Blake Griffin (7)
| Chris Paul (10)
| Staples Center19,060
| 28–21
|- bgcolor=#cfc
| 50
| March 28
| Phoenix
| 
| Blake Griffin (27)
| Blake Griffin (14)
| Chris Paul (15)
| Staples Center19,060
| 29–21
|- bgcolor=#cfc
| 51
| March 30
| Portland
| 
| Three players (20)
| Blake Griffin (13)
| Chris Paul (14)
| Staples Center19,060
| 30–21
|- bgcolor=#cfc
| 52
| March 31
| Utah
| 
| Chris Paul (26)
| DeAndre Jordan (10)
| Three players (6)
| Staples Center19,060
| 31–21

|- bgcolor=#cfc
| 53
| April 2
| @ Dallas
| 
| Randy Foye (28)
| Blake Griffin (16)
| Chris Paul (10)
| American Airlines Center20,479
| 32–21
|- bgcolor=#fcc
| 54
| April 4
| L. A. Lakers
| 
| Caron Butler (28)
| Blake Griffin (9)
| Chris Paul (8)
| Staples Center19,819
| 32–22
|- bgcolor=#cfc
| 55
| April 5
| @ Sacramento
| 
| Randy Foye (20)
| Blake Griffin (14)
| Chris Paul (16)
| Power Balance Pavilion14,411
| 33–22
|- bgcolor=#cfc
| 56
| April 7
| Sacramento
| 
| Blake Griffin (27)
| Blake Griffin (14)
| Chris Paul (15)
| Staples Center19,060
| 34–22
|- bgcolor=#fcc
| 57
| April 9
| @ Memphis
| 
| Chris Paul (21)
| DeAndre Jordan (14)
| Chris Paul (6)
| FedEx Forum17,219
| 34–23
|- bgcolor=#cfc
| 58
| April 11
| @ Oklahoma City
| 
| Chris Paul (31)
| Blake Griffin (12)
| Blake Griffin (7)
| Chesapeake Energy Arena18,203
| 35–23
|- bgcolor=#cfc
| 59
| April 12
| @ Minnesota
| 
| Blake Griffin (19)
| Blake Griffin (13)
| Chris Paul (8)
| Target Center16,016
| 36–23
|- bgcolor=#cfc
| 60
| April 14
| Golden State
| 
| Chris Paul (28)
| Blake Griffin (9)
| Chris Paul (13)
| Staples Center19,060
| 37–23
|- bgcolor=#cfc
| 61
| April 16
| Oklahoma City
| 
| Nick Young (19)
| DeAndre Jordan (12)
| Chris Paul (10)
| Staples Center19,516
| 38–23
|- bgcolor=#cfc
| 62
| April 18
| @ Denver
| 
| Chris Paul (21)
| DeAndre Jordan (9)
| Chris Paul (8)
| Pepsi Center17,219
| 39–23
|- bgcolor=#fcc
| 63
| April 19
| @ Phoenix
| 
| Chris Paul (19)
| Blake Griffin (11)
| Chris Paul (10)
| US Airways Center14,644
| 39–24
|- bgcolor=#cfc
| 64
| April 22
| New Orleans
| 
| Chris Paul (33)
| Blake Griffin (15)
| Chris Paul (13)
| Staples Center19,060
| 40–24
|- bgcolor=#fcc
| 65
| April 24
| @ Atlanta
| 
| Blake Griffin (36)
| DeAndre Jordan (9)
| Chris Paul (8)
| Philips Arena18,223
| 40–25
|- bgcolor=#fcc
| 66
| April 25
| @ New York
| 
| Blake Griffin (29)
| Blake GriffinDeAndre Jordan (10)
| Blake Griffin (6)
| Madison Square Garden19,763
| 40–26

Playoffs

|- align="center" bgcolor="#ccffcc"
| 1
| April 29
| @ Memphis
| W 99–98
| Nick Young (19)
| Reggie Evans (13)
| Chris Paul (11)
| FedExForum18,119
| 1–0
|- align="center" bgcolor="#ffcccc"
| 2
| May 2
| @ Memphis
| L 98–105
| Chris Paul (29)
| Blake Griffin (9)
| Chris Paul (6)
| FedExForum18,119
| 1–1
|- align="center" bgcolor="#ccffcc"
| 3
| May 5
| Memphis
| W 87–86
| Chris Paul (24)
| Reggie Evans (11)
| Chris Paul (11)
| Staples Center19,060
| 2–1
|- align="center" bgcolor="#ccffcc"
| 4
| May 7
| Memphis
| W 101–97 (OT)
| Blake Griffin (30)
| Chris Paul (9)
| Griffin, Paul (7)
| Staples Center19,167
| 3–1
|- align="center" bgcolor="#ffcccc"
| 5
| May 9
| @ Memphis
| L 80–92
| Mo Williams (20)
| Blake Griffin (11)
| Chris Paul (4)
| FedExForum18,119
| 3–2
|- align="center" bgcolor="#ffcccc"
| 6
| May 11
| Memphis
| L 88–90
| Blake Griffin (15)
| Reggie Evans (10)
| Chris Paul (7)
| Staples Center19,060
| 3–3
|- align="center" bgcolor="#ccffcc"
| 7
| May 13
| @ Memphis
| W 82–72
| Chris Paul (19)
| Kenyon Martin (10)
| Chris Paul (4)
| FedExForum18,119
| 4–3
|-

|- align="center" bgcolor="#ffcccc"
| 1
| May 15
| @ San Antonio
| L 92–108
| Eric Bledsoe (23)
| Griffin, Jordan (9)
| Chris Paul (10)
| AT&T Center18,581
| 0–1
|- align="center" bgcolor="#ffcccc"
| 2
| May 17
| @ San Antonio
| L 88–105
| Blake Griffin (20)
| DeAndre Jordan (7)
| Chris Paul (5)
| AT&T Center18,581
| 0–2
|- align="center" bgcolor="#ffcccc"
| 3
| May 19
| San Antonio
| L 86–96
| Blake Griffin (28)
| Blake Griffin (16)
| Chris Paul (11)
| Staples Center19,060
| 0–3
|- align="center" bgcolor="#ffcccc"
| 4
| May 20
| San Antonio
| L 99–102
| Chris Paul (23)
| DeAndre Jordan (8)
| Chris Paul (11)
| Staples Center19,060
| 0–4
|-

Injuries and surgeries

Transactions

Trades

Free agents

Re-signed

Additions

Subtractions

References

Los Angeles Clippers seasons
Los Angeles Clippers